The 1975 Benson & Hedges Cup was the fourth edition of cricket's Benson & Hedges Cup. The competition was won by Leicestershire County Cricket Club.

Fixtures and results

Group stage

Midlands Group

Northern Group

Southern Group

Western Group

Quarter-finals

Semi-finals

Final

See also
Benson & Hedges Cup

Benson and Hedges Cup
Benson & Hedges Cup seasons